Indolepropionamide (IPAM) is a chemical compound with the molecular formula C11H12N2O.  In vivo (rats), IPAM markedly reduced the proton potential collapse induced by the mitochondrial toxins to nearly baseline levels in both young and old rats and demonstrated free-radical scavenging properties. IPAM was shown to increase complex I and complex IV activity in the mitochondrial electron transport chain, however complex II and complex III were left unchanged. Decreased activity of complexes I and IV results in an inhibition of electron transport that is associated with higher production of ROS. IPAM can also act as a recyclable electron and proton carrier, facilitating reversible endogenous radical and redox reactions, and thereby enabling the formation of a proton gradient that drives mitochondrial ATP synthesis. Thus, IPAM acts as a stabilizer of energy metabolism in mitochondria, thereby reducing the production of reactive oxygen species.

IPAM-treated rotifers (Caenorhabditis elegans) had a lifespan extended by approximately 300%, the number of offsprings increased by 3.4 times and body length increased by 1.47 times, in comparison with IPAM-untreated rotifers. Researchers noted, that such a lifespan extension in this particular rotifer species is the highest that was ever observed to date in any study. Indolepropionamide shows potential as an anti-aging molecule, a mitochondrial metabolism modifier and may have a therapeutic value in age-related neurodegenerative, and mitochondrial diseases.

In rodents, IPAM was detected as endogenously occurring and its levels can be slightly increased after administration of L-tryptophan (but not IPA or melatonin). IPAM has high bioavailability as it can efficiently cross the blood-brain barrier and remain at high concentrations in rat brains for several hours. In rats, IPAM was administered at a dosage of 0.5mg/kg.

See also
 3-Indolepropionic acid

References

Carboxamides
Indoles